"Girls, Girls, Girls" is a single by American heavy metal band Mötley Crüe. It is the first single from the album of the same name, and was released on May 11, 1987.

Production
The track was thoroughly pre-produced, and was then recorded at different studios over the course of several weeks, starting with the drum parts, then bass and guitar, and finally vocals.

Meaning
The song references several strip clubs, including The Tropicana, The Body Shop, Seventh Veil (all located on the Sunset Strip in Los Angeles), the Marble Arch (Vancouver, BC), The Dollhouse (Fort Lauderdale), the famous Crazy Horse in Paris, and Tattletales in Atlanta.

Music video
Filmed on the night of April 13, 1987, Mötley Crüe shot their video for "Girls, Girls, Girls" with director Wayne Isham. With a strip club theme planned for the video, they originally wanted to use The Body Shop, but since that venue is all-nude and does not serve alcohol, they ended up shooting it at The Seventh Veil. By the time they finished at the club, none of the band members were functioning properly. They left the club on their motorcycles to go to Isham's studio nearby to film inserts, stopping off at a Mexican restaurant for shooters and taquitos on the way.

The original cut of the video featured topless dancers and was purposely sent by Isham to MTV before it was rejected and replaced with a more sanitized version.

Personnel
 Vince Neil – vocals
 Mick Mars – guitar
 Nikki Sixx – bass
 Tommy Lee – drums

Charts

Legacy
In 2010, "Girls, Girls, Girls" was made available as a download for Guitar Hero 5 as part of the "80's Track Pack".

References

Mötley Crüe songs
1987 songs
1987 singles
Music videos directed by Wayne Isham
Songs written by Nikki Sixx
Songs written by Mick Mars
Songs written by Tommy Lee
Song recordings produced by Tom Werman
Elektra Records singles